Oregon Senate Bill 577 was a change to Oregon's Hate Crimes Law. Bias is defined as "disproportionate weight in favor of or against an idea or thing, usually in a way that is closed-minded, prejudicial, or unfair. Biases can be innate or learned. People may develop biases for or against an individual, a group, or a belief". A bias crime or a bias-motivated crime is a more official label for a hate crime. These changes “made it a class A misdemeanor to damage someone’s property, intentionally subject them to offensive physical contact or intentionally cause serious injury on a person based on race, color, religion, sexual orientation, disability or national origin. It also removes the prior requirement that a hate crime had to involve more than one suspect”. Oregon Senate Bill 577 was put into effect on July 15th, 2019. This was the first time this law had been updated in almost 40 years.

Other than just the additions of what is defined as a crime, “The bill would also require all police agencies to document reports of alleged hate crimes – whether or not they result in arrest – and share information with the state criminal justice division. District attorneys will also be required to track their hate crime case loads and report on outcomes, sentences and recidivism”. With police and attorneys registering the crimes that they deal with, it will give a more accurate representation of how many bias crimes are reported and dealt with. Even with this editing of the bill "National data collection can be complicated by inconsistent reporting requirements on the state level. For example, as of 2019, 37 states still do not have anti-bias statutes for crimes based on gender identity". with the requirement of police and attorneys registering these crimes, more data will give us an accurate representation, and possibly make more states implement bias crime laws.  

There are a multitude of supporters behind the bill such as “Unite Oregon, American Civil Liberties Union of Oregon, Basic Rights Oregon, and CAIR-Oregon; Oregon State Police; Salem Police Chief Jerry Moore; and the Multnomah County District Attorney's Office”. No one has officially submitted any testimony against the bill.

Timeline of OSB 577 

On January 14, 2019 in the Senate:

 Introduction and first reading. Referred to President's desk.

On January 17, 2019 in the Senate:

 Referred to Judiciary, then Ways and Means.

On March 12, 2019 in the Senate:

 Public Hearing held.

On April 4, 2019 in the Senate:

 Work Session held.

On April 23, 2019 in the Senate:

 Referred to Ways and Means by prior reference.
 Recommendation: Do pass with amendments and be referred to Ways and Means by prior reference. (Printed A-Eng.)

On June 3, 2019 in the Senate:

 Assigned to Subcommittee On Public Safety.

On June 5, 2019 in the Senate:

 Returned to Full Committee.
 Work Session held.

On June 7, 2019 in the Senate:

 Work Session held.

On June 11, 2019 in the Senate:

 Recommendation: Do pass with amendments to the A-Eng. bill. (Printed B-Eng.)

On June 12, 2019 in the Senate:

 Second reading.

On June 13, 2019 in the Senate:

 Steiner Hayward, excused when vote taken, granted unanimous consent to vote aye.
 Third reading. Carried by Frederick. Passed. Ayes, 27; Excused, 2--Boquist, Johnson.

On June 17, 2019 in the House:

 Referred to Ways and Means.
 First reading. Referred to Speaker's desk.

On June 18, 2019 in the House:

 Second reading.
 Recommendation: Do pass.

On June 19, 2019 in the House:

 Third reading. Carried by Williamson. Passed. Ayes, 59; Excused for Business of the House, 1--Power.

On June 24, 2019 in the Senate:

 President signed.

On June 25, 2019 in the House:

 Speaker signed.

On July 15, 2019 in the Senate:

 Governor signed.

On July 23, 2019 in the Senate:

 Effective date, July 15, 2019.
 Chapter 553, 2019 Laws.

References 

Oregon law
Hate crime